Alfred Herbert Amos (9 February 1893 – 27 October 1959) was an English professional footballer who played as a wing half in the Football League for Brentford and Millwall. He is a member of the Millwall Hall of Fame.

Career 
A wing half, Amos began his career as an amateur with Old Kingstonians and joined Southern League Second Division club Brentford in 1913. He remained with Brentford during the First World War and was still a regular in the team when the club was admitted to the new Football League Third Division for the 1920–21 season. By the time Amos transferred to Millwall in 1922, he had made 139 appearances and scored five goals for Brentford. He remained with Millwall for seven seasons and was an ever-present in the team which finished the 1927–28 season as Third Division South champions, which secured promotion to the Second Division for the first time in the club's history. Amos' achievements were recognised posthumously with a place in the Millwall Hall of Fame. He finished his career with non-league club Hitchin Town and had a successful spell as the club's manager.

Personal life 
Amos served in the British Armed Forces during the First World War.

Career statistics

Honours

Player 
Brentford
 London Combination (1): 1918–19
Millwall
 Football League Third Division South (1): 1927–28

Manager 
Hitchin Town
 Spartan League Premier Division (1): 1934–35
 Spartan League First Division second-place promotion (1): 1930–31
 Spartan League Challenge Cup (1): 1935
 AFA Senior Cup (1): 1931–32
 Herts Senior Cup (3): 1930–31, 1931–32, 1933–34

Individual 

 Millwall Hall of Fame

References 

English footballers
Brentford F.C. players
Millwall F.C. players
English Football League players
1893 births
1959 deaths
Kingstonian F.C. players
Southern Football League players
Hitchin Town F.C. players
Hitchin Town F.C. managers
Association football wing halves
British military personnel of World War I
English football managers